In commutative algebra, a Krull ring, or Krull domain, is a commutative ring with a well behaved theory of prime factorization. They were introduced by Wolfgang Krull in 1931. They are a higher-dimensional generalization of Dedekind domains, which are exactly the Krull domains of dimension at most 1.

In this article, a ring is commutative and has unity.

Formal definition
Then  is a Krull ring if
  is a discrete valuation ring for all , 
 is the intersection of these discrete valuation rings (considered as subrings of the quotient field of ).

It is also possible to characterize Krull rings by mean of valuations only:

An integral domain  is a Krull ring if there exists a family  
of discrete valuations on the field of fractions  of   such that: 
 for any   and all  , except possibly a finite number of them,  ; 
 for any  ,  belongs to  if and only if   for all  .

Then the set  satisfies the conditions of the equivalent definition. In other words,  is the minimal set of normalized valuations satisfying the equivalent definition.

There are other ways to introduce and define Krull rings. The theory of Krull rings can be exposed in synergy with the theory of divisorial ideals. One of the best references on the subject is Lecture on Unique Factorization Domains by P. Samuel.

Properties 

 An element  belongs to  if, and only if,  for every . Indeed, in this case,  for every , hence ; by the intersection property, .
Indeed, if  for every , then , hence  by the above property (q.e.d).
 The valuations  are pairwise independent.
 Any finite intersection of Krull domains whose quotient fields are the same is again a Krull domain.
 If  is a multiplicatively closed set not containing 0, the ring of quotients  is again a Krull domain.

Examples
Any unique factorization domain is a Krull domain. Conversely, a Krull domain is a unique factorization domain if (and only if) every prime ideal of height one is principal. 
 Every integrally closed noetherian domain is a Krull domain. In particular,  Dedekind domains are Krull domains. Conversely, Krull domains are integrally closed, so a Noetherian domain is Krull if and only if it is integrally closed.
 If  is a Krull domain then so is the polynomial ring  and the formal power series ring .
 The polynomial ring  in infinitely many variables over a unique factorization domain  is a Krull domain which is not noetherian. 
This follows easily from numero 2 above.
Let  be a Zariski ring (e.g., a local noetherian ring). If the completion   is a Krull domain, then  is a Krull domain (Mori).
Let  be a Krull domain, and  be the multiplicatively closed set consisting in the powers of a prime element . Then  is a Krull domain (Nagata).

The divisor class group of a Krull ring

The set of prime divisors of  will be denoted  in the sequel.
They form an Abelian group, 
noted .

Assume that  is a Krull domain containing .

Define the application  by 

(the above sum is finite since every  is contained in at most finitely many elements of ).
Let extend the application  by linearity to a linear application .
One can now ask in what cases  induces a morphism . This leads to several results. For example, the following generalizes a theorem of Gauss:

The application  is bijective.

The divisor class group of a Krull rings are also used to setup powerful descent methods, and in particular the Galoisian descent.

Cartier divisor
A Cartier divisor of a Krull ring is a locally principal (Weil) divisor. The Cartier divisors form a subgroup of the group of divisors containing the principal divisors. The quotient of the Cartier divisors by the principal divisors is a subgroup of the divisor class group, isomorphic to the Picard group of invertible sheaves on Spec(A).

Example: in the ring k[x,y,z]/(xy–z2) the divisor class group has order 2, generated by the divisor y=z, but the Picard subgroup is the trivial group.

References

 

 Hideyuki Matsumura, Commutative Algebra. Second Edition. Mathematics Lecture Note Series, 56. Benjamin/Cummings Publishing Co., Inc., Reading, Mass., 1980. xv+313 pp. 
 Hideyuki Matsumura, Commutative Ring Theory. Translated from the Japanese by M. Reid. Cambridge Studies in Advanced Mathematics, 8. Cambridge University Press, Cambridge, 1986. xiv+320 pp. 

Ring theory
Commutative algebra